San Benito is a District of the Contumazá Province in the Cajamarca Region of Peru.

References 
  Instituto Nacional de Estadística e Informática. Banco de Información Digital. Retrieved December 26, 2007.

Populated places in the Cajamarca Region